The Saccocirridae are small interstitial polychaetes common in coarse sand on reflective, surf beaches, usually within the zone of retention.  The Saccociridae are members of the clade Protodrilida, which is in turn part of the clade Canalipalpata.  Saccocirridae have a worldwide distribution and many more species likely remain to be described.  These polychates are usually between 2 and 10 mm in length and 500 μm wide.  They have reduced parapodia and are considered a true interstitial species, incapable of burrowing through finer sediments.

Morphology 
Based on Saccocirrus sonomacus from the Pacific Coast of the Americas, the prostomium supports a pair of grooved palps that have a primarily sensory purpose. A pair of eyes are also present. The peristomium is probably reduced to a circumoral ring. The  pygidium is usually bilobed.

References

Polychaetes
Annelid families